Gortynia is a municipality in the Arcadia regional unit, Peloponnese, Greece. The seat of the municipality is the town Dimitsana. The municipality has an area of 1,050.882 km2.

Municipality
The municipality Gortynia was formed at the 2011 local government reform by the merger of the following 8 former municipalities, that became municipal units:
Dimitsana
Iraia
Kleitor
Kontovazaina
Langadia
Trikolonoi
Tropaia
Vytina

Province
The province of Gortynia was one of the four provinces of Arcadia Prefecture. It was abolished in 2006. Its territory corresponded with that of the current municipality Gortynia and the municipal unit Gortyna.

References

Municipalities of Peloponnese (region)
Populated places in Arcadia, Peloponnese
Provinces of Greece